Wolf Den is the first full-length studio album by American singer-songwriter Danielle Nicole (she had previously released a self titled EP).  It was released on August 21, 2015.   The majority of the writing for the album was reportedly completed in just three days.  The album itself was recorded at Esplanade Studios in six days.

Critical reception 
McKinnie Sizemore writing for Blues Rock Review gave the album 8/10. John Mitchell writing in Blues Blast Magazine described it as a "great piece of soul and New Orleans-infused blues". Describing the album as "all about the singers voice" and that in this regard, she "nailed it".

Track listing

Personnel 
Adapted from the albums' liner notes.

 Danielle Nicole – vocals, bass
 Anders Osborne – guitar
 Luther Dickinson – guitar (track 8,9)
 Mike Sedovic – keyboards
 Stanton Moore – drums

Charts

References 

Danielle Nicole albums
Concord Records albums
2015 albums